Bai Yuefeng (born May 25, 1987), former name Bai Lei, is a Chinese football player of Korean descent who currently plays for Tianjin Teda F.C. in the Chinese Super League.

Club career
Born to Korean parents Bai Yuefeng was born and raised in China before he started his football career with the Beijing Huaya Feiying youth team where he was considered good enough to travel to Serbia and Montenegro on a three-year football training program. On his return he was scouted by top tier Chinese football team Shanghai International, however he sustained a serious injury during training and the club ended their interest, nevertheless recently promoted side Xiamen Blue Lions were willing to take a risk on him and Bai Lei signed a professional contract with them at the beginning of the 2006 league season. With  Xiamen he would quickly be included in the squads first team and make his league debut against Shandong Luneng on March 12, 2006 in a 3-1 defeat. Despite that defeat he would quickly establish himself within the squad and go on to score his first goal for the club in a league game on September 17, 2006 against Shenzhen Kingway in a 2-0 victory. The following season would see him continue to cement his position in the Xiamen team, however he couldn't prevent them from being relegated at the end of the 2007 league season. Bai would go on to join newly promoted Chinese Super League side Guangzhou Pharmaceutical at the beginning of the 2008 league season and immediately go on to be a vital part of the squads first team and play in the club's first league game of the season against Shenzhen Xiangxue on March 30, 2008 in a 3-0 victory. Throughout the course of the season the club's manager Shen Xiangfu would permanently move him into the team's defence and this seemed to work as Bai would help guide Guangzhou to seventh-place finish at the end of season.

While Bai continued his good form for Guangzhou the club were discovered to be involved in a match-fixing scandal that was directly related to their promotion to the top tier and were relegated at the end of the 2009 league season. Bai refused to return Guangzhou for pre-season training and searched for transfer. On February 12, 2010 Bai joined Tianjin Teda for a fee of ¥1.7 million. He made his debut in a league game against Shanghai Shenhua on April 14, 2010 in a 2-0 defeat. Throughout the season he was given more opportunities by the manager Arie Haan who decided to move Bai to full back, this seemed to work as he would go on to a vital member of the team and help the club to a runners-up position at the end of the league campaign.

International career
Bai Lei would make his first appearance for the China national football team on June 4, 2010 in a friendly match against France in a 1-0 victory. In reparation for the 2011 AFC Asian Cup he would make his second appearance in a friendly against Syria on October 8, 2010 in a 2-1 victory.

Career statistics
Statistics accurate as of match played 31 December 2020.

Honours

Club
Tianjin Teda
Chinese FA Cup: 2011

References

External links
Player profile at sports.qq.com
Player profile at Guangzhou Pharmaceutical website
Player stats at Sohu.com
 
 

1987 births
Living people
People from Yanbian
Chinese footballers
Footballers from Jilin
Chinese people of Korean descent
China international footballers
Xiamen Blue Lions players
Guangzhou F.C. players
Tianjin Jinmen Tiger F.C. players
Chinese Super League players
Association football fullbacks
Association football midfielders